Isabella Charli Gaze (born 8 May 2004) is a Dutch-born New Zealand cricketer who currently plays for Auckland Hearts and New Zealand. She plays as a wicket-keeper and right-handed batter.

Early life
Gaze was born on 8 May 2004 in Haarlem in the Netherlands. She lived in the Netherlands for 18 months before moving to Hong Kong, then Singapore, and finally to Auckland, New Zealand. At the age of 18, Gaze went to university and worked part-time after the domestic cricket season in New Zealand had ended.

Domestic career
Gaze made her debut for Auckland in 2019, against Wellington in the 2019–20 Super Smash. She missed much of the 2020–21 season due to a collarbone fracture.

International career
Gaze was part of a New Zealand camp ahead of the side's series against India and the 2022 World Cup. Following the retirement of New Zealand wicket-keeper Katey Martin after the World Cup, Gaze was awarded a central contract by New Zealand Cricket.

Gaze earned her first call-up to the full New Zealand side in June 2022, when she was selected in the squad for the 2022 Commonwealth Games. She made her Twenty20 International debut on 30 July 2022, against South Africa in New Zealand's first match at the Commonwealth Games. She made her One Day International debut on 19 September 2022, on New Zealand's tour of the West Indies.

In December 2022, Gaze was selected in the New Zealand Under-19 squad for the 2023 ICC Under-19 Women's T20 World Cup. She scored 47 runs in her three innings at the tournament.

References

External links
 
 

2004 births
Living people
Sportspeople from Haarlem
New Zealand women cricketers
New Zealand women One Day International cricketers
New Zealand women Twenty20 International cricketers
Auckland Hearts cricketers
Cricketers at the 2022 Commonwealth Games
Commonwealth Games bronze medallists for New Zealand
Commonwealth Games medallists in cricket
Medallists at the 2022 Commonwealth Games